Tagliabue is a surname. Notable people with the surname include:

Benedetta Tagliabue (born 1963), Italian architect
Carlo Tagliabue (1898–1978), Italian baritone
Elena Tagliabue (born 1977), Italian alpine skier
Gerald Tagliabue (born 1935), Australian rules footballer
Paola Tagliabue (born 1976), Italian free diver
Paul Tagliabue (born 1940), American NFL commissioner
Sebastián Tagliabué (born 1985), Emirati football player

See also